Lee Eun-young may refer to:
 Lee Eun-young (field hockey)
 Lee Eun-young (taekwondo)
 Ben (South Korean singer) (Lee Eun-young), South Korean singer and songwriter